Arizona's 30th legislative district is one of 30 in the state, situated in central Maricopa County. As of 2023, there are 38 precincts in the district, with a total registered voter population of 157,848. The district has an overall population of 240,466.

Political representation
The district is represented for the 2023–2024 Legislative Session by Leo Biasiucci and John Gillette in the Arizona House of Representatives, and by Sonny Borrelli in the Arizona Senate. All 3 representatives are members of the Republican Party

References 

Maricopa County, Arizona
Arizona legislative districts